The Gürtel is a substantial city road of Vienna. Running  parallel to the famous Vienna Ring Road, it encompasses the inner city districts (Innenbezirke) and follows the route of the former Linienwall outer fortification. The city's red-light district is situated around the Gürtel.

History 

The Gürtel was laid out from 1873 at the site of the former Linienwall fortification, built under Emperor Leopold I at the beginning of the 18th century to protect his residence from kuruc invasions in the course of Rákóczi's War for Independence. After World War I, the road became the construction site for several public housing estates (Gemeindebauten) in the era of Red Vienna. As in most parts of Austria-Hungary, vehicles formerly moved on the left, like in Britain, until after the Anschluss in 1938. According to German regulations, traffic in Vienna was redirected to pass on the right as elsewhere on the Continent. Plans developed in the 1960s and 70s to rebuild the Gürtel as a city motorway have never been carried out. The road, like the adjacent residential areas, is however strongly affected by the high traffic volume.

Layout 

The road is officially called B 221 Wiener Gürtel Straße.

In the south it starts at the junction with the A23 Südosttangente motorway in the Landstraße district and runs westward toward the Central Station, where the Vienna Pre-metro has been built under surface. There the Wiedner Gürtel and Margaretengürtel mark the border of Wieden and Margareten with the southern Favoriten suburb.  The Gürtel then turns north, running along the eastern rim of the Meidling suburb, crossing the Wienfluss and the Wienzeile road, separating the inner city districts of Mariahilf and Neubau in the east from Rudolfsheim-Fünfhaus with the Westbahnhof. The road continues as the border of Josefstadt and Alsergrund with the outer Hernals and Währing districts, passing the General Hospital (Allgemeines Krankenhaus, AKH) and the Volksoper.

At its northern end in Döbling, the Gürtel reaches the Donaukanal at the Gürtelbrücke.  From the Wienzeile to the northern end, the dual carriageway is accompanied by the historic Stadtbahn viaduct designed by Otto Wagner, today operated by the U6 U-Bahn line.

Further reading 
 Madeleine Petrovic: Der Wiener Gürtel. Wiederentdeckung einer lebendigen Prachtstraße (Verlag Christian Brandstätter: Wien, 1998).

References

External links 

Streets in Vienna
Ring roads
Landstraße
Buildings and structures in Wieden
Margareten
Mariahilf
Neubau
Josefstadt
Alsergrund
Meidling
Rudolfsheim-Fünfhaus
Ottakring
Hernals
Buildings and structures in Währing
Döbling
Red-light districts in Austria